Gary M. Brito (born 1963 or 1964) is a United States Army general who serves as Commanding General, United States Army Training and Doctrine Command since September 8, 2022. He served as Deputy Chief of Staff, G-1 of the United States Army from July 2020 to August 2022. He was also the first Cape Verdean American to command Fort Benning. Born and raised in Hyannis, Massachusetts, he was commissioned in 1987 from ROTC at the Pennsylvania State University.

Brito earned a Bachelor of Science degree in Community Studies from the Pennsylvania State University. He later received a master's degree in Human Resource Management from Troy State University and another master's degree in Joint Strategy and Campaign Planning from the Joint Advanced Warfighting School.

Awards and decorations

References

1960s births
Living people
People from Hyannis, Massachusetts
Pennsylvania State University alumni
Troy University alumni
Joint Forces Staff College alumni
United States Army generals
Military personnel from Massachusetts